Industrial group may refer to:

 Industry, a segment of the economy
 Industrial Revolution, the development of industry in the 19th century
 Industrial society, one that has undergone industrialization
 Industrial engineering group (disambiguation)
 Industrial Groups which were formed by the Australian Labor Party in the late 1940s, to combat Communist Party influence in trade 
 an industrial concern, see Concern (business)
 an industrial group that is an organization of companies in different industries with common ownership interests, which include firms necessary to manufacture and sell products—a network of manufacturers, suppliers, marketing organizations, distributors, retailers, and creditors